Seymour Lane Dwinell (November 14, 1906 – March 27, 1997) was an American manufacturer and Republican politician from Lebanon, New Hampshire. Born in 1906 in Newport, Vermont, he served in and led both houses of the New Hampshire legislature before his tenure as the 69th governor of New Hampshire from 1955 to 1959. He died in 1997 aged 90 in Hanover, New Hampshire and is buried in Lebanon, New Hampshire.

External links
Dwinell at New Hampshire's Division of Historic Resources

1906 births
1997 deaths
Republican Party members of the New Hampshire House of Representatives
Republican Party governors of New Hampshire
Republican Party New Hampshire state senators
Presidents of the New Hampshire Senate
Burials in New Hampshire
20th-century American politicians